Duane Jones  (born 30 April 1993) is a Welsh professional snooker player.

Career

Junior
Jones started playing snooker aged twelve, joining his local snooker club and playing on full sized tables after being impressed at how easy Jimmy White made the game look on television. He later became Welsh under-16 captain and the youngest player to win the singles in the Aberdare Valley Snooker League.

Amateur
During the 2010–11 season, Jones started to feature in Players Tour Championship events, as well as Q School and ranking events as a top up player. In the 2013 Welsh Open, Jones beat former World Championship semi-finalist Andy Hicks in the opening round of qualifying 4–3, before a narrow 4–3 defeat to former world champion Neil Robertson in the following round. Jones, lost at the final stage of Q School in 2013 (to Lee Spick) and 2014 (to Chris Melling), however these performance did earn him the chance to compete in more ranking events as a top up amateur player. The most notable result he recorded being a 5–2 win over top 16 player Joe Perry with breaks of 141, 137, 75 and 74 to qualify for the 2014 China Open, where he lost 5–3 to Yu Delu in the first round.

Professional
In 2015, Jones was successful in Q School and earned a tour card for the 2015–16 and 2016–17 seasons by beating Zhao Xintong 4–3 in his final match of Event 2 in a black ball finish in the deciding frame. His first win as a professional came at attempt number one as he defeated Sam Thistlewhite 5–1 in the 2015 Australian Goldfields Open qualifiers, before falling 5–1 to Sam Baird. Jones only won one more match in the rest of the season, which included losing his last eight.

Jones qualified for the 2016 Indian Open with a 4–2 victory over Yu Delu and narrowly beat Liam Highfield 4–3 in the first round to reach the last 32 of a ranking event for the first time, where he lost 4–1 to Peter Ebdon. He got to the second round in three of the four Home Nations tournaments, but was knocked out each time. He finished the year outside the top 64, but immediately regained his professional status with a victory in event two of Q-School. Wins over Simon Bedford, Peter Delaney, Declan Brennan, Hao Hu and Alex Davies ensured Jones would be back on the tour for the next two seasons.

Performance and rankings timeline

Career finals

Amateur finals: 3 (2 titles)

References

External links
Duane Jones at CueTracker.net: Snooker Results and Statistic Database
Duane Jones at worldsnooker.com

1993 births
Welsh snooker players
Living people
People from Mountain Ash, Wales
Sportspeople from Rhondda Cynon Taf